H Street station is a station on the Blue Line of the San Diego Trolley located in the city of Chula Vista, California. The stop serves both as a commuter center with a park and ride lot and as an access point to the nearby dense retail and large residential areas. It also provides access to nearby Southwestern Community College by way of the 709 bus.

History

This station was renovated, starting March 20, 2014, as part of the Trolley Renewal Project; it reopened with a renovated station platform in late October 2014.

Station layout
There are two tracks, each with a side platform.

See also
 List of San Diego Trolley stations

References

Blue Line (San Diego Trolley)
Railway stations in the United States opened in 1981
San Diego Trolley stations
Transportation in Chula Vista, California
Buildings and structures in Chula Vista, California
1981 establishments in California